Revista da Folha (Folha's Magazine, in English) is a weekly magazine distributed by Folha de S.Paulo on Sundays. The magazine was founded by Caio Túlio Costa in 1992. It is a diverse magazine, reporting on film, theatre, fashion, TV programs, etc. The headquarters of the magazine is in São Paulo.

References

External links
Official website
Folha Online

1992 establishments in Brazil
Magazines published in Brazil
Weekly magazines published in Brazil
Magazines established in 1992
Mass media in São Paulo
Newspaper supplements
Portuguese-language magazines
Sunday magazines